Tuanjie Lake is a lake in the southeastern Qarhan Playa north of Golmud in the Haixi Prefecture of Qinghai Province in northwestern China. It is fed from the south by the Shougong River. Like the other lakes of the surrounding Qaidam Basin, it is extremely saline.

Geography 

It lies southeast of Dabusun Lake, south of Xiezuo Lake, and west of South Hulsan Lake and is fed by the intermittent stream of the Shougong River  Shōugōng Hé). Its depth usually does not exceed .

Tuanjie's position at the south end of the playa means that its waters are relatively less influenced by the concentrated mineral springs along the playa's northern boundary. Nonetheless, the lake's brine is at or near saturation with calcite, halite, polyhalite, kieserite, and (importantly) carnallite, which is processed to produce potash for potassium-rich fertilizers and other uses.

See also 
 Qarhan Playa & Qaidam Basin
 List of lakes and saltwater lakes of China

References

Citations

Bibliography 
 .
 .
 .
 .
 .

Lakes of China
Lakes of Qinghai
Haixi Mongol and Tibetan Autonomous Prefecture